Bucculatrix packardella is a moth in the family Bucculatricidae. It was described by Vactor Tousey Chambers in 1873. It is found in North America, where it has been recorded from Ohio, Maine, Michigan, Ontario, Pennsylvania, Washington D.C., Delaware, New Jersey, New York and Rhode Island.

The wingspan is 6-6.5 mm. The forewings are creamy white, in the basal half somewhat obscured by fine dusting of minute brown-tipped scales. In the apical half, the scales are pale golden brown or orange tinged. The hindwings are pale straw-coloured. Adults have been recorded on wing from March to September and in November. There may be up to three generations per year.

The larvae feed on Quercus species. They mine the leaves of their host plant. The mine is short and thread-like, at first following a vein, but later sharply diverging from it. Older larvae feed freely on the underside of the leaves, eating small irregular patches of leaf tissue. Pupation takes place in a white cocoon, which is spun on leaves or bark of trees, or in 
herbage beneath the tree.

References

Natural History Museum Lepidoptera generic names catalog

Bucculatricidae
Moths described in 1873
Moths of North America